Étienne Eugène Cicéri (27 January 1813 – 20 April 1890) was a French painter, illustrator, engraver and theatrical designer.

Biography 
He came from an artistic family. His father was the scenographer, Pierre-Luc-Charles Cicéri. He was also the grandson of the painter Jean-Baptiste Isabey, and his mother's brother was the painter Eugène Isabey.

He received his first lessons from his father and his uncle and became influenced by the Barbizon School while still young. He decided to specialize in landscapes and was one of the first artists to work in Bourron-Marlotte, where he settled in 1849. His first exhibit at the Salon came in 1851. The following year, his painting of the banks of the Loing was awarded a second-class medal.

He was also a watercolorist and published albums of lithographs based on photographs; breaking with his Romantic predecessors to present scenes realistically. One of his most popular albums was derived from trips he made to the Alps and the Pyrénées: Les Pyrénées dessinées d'après nature et lithographiées and La Suisse et la Savoie, based on photographs by  taken from 1859 to 1865. Later, he was one of the artists who participated in illustrating the travel writings of Baron Taylor and Charles Nodier, collected as Voyages pittoresques et romantiques dans l'ancienne France, featuring views of Brittany. A few of his works were done in North Africa, gaining him a reputation as an Orientalist.

Like his father, he also did theatrical set designs and some decorative work; notably at the Château de Montmort.

References

Further reading 
 Hélène Saule-Sorbé, Pyrénées, voyage par les images, éditions de Faucompret, 1993 
 Gérald Schurr and Pierre Cabanne, Dictionnaire des Petits Maîtres de la peinture, 1820–1920, Paris, éditions de l'Amateur, 2008

External links

More works by Cicéri @ ArtNet

1813 births
1890 deaths
19th-century French painters
French landscape painters
French engravers
Scenographers
French illustrators